The Basilica di Sant’Andrea Apostolo is an 18th-century, Neoclassical-style, Roman Catholic co-cathedral in the town of Subiaco, region of Lazio, Italy.

The church replaced an earlier church dedicated to  Saint Abundius, and was consecrated by Pope Pius VI in 1789. The pope's coat of arms is depicted in the tympanum above the main portal. The frescoes in the prior church, completed by Manente and Caracci, were not preserved. 

The church was nearly destroyed during World War II, and rebuilt as before in the 1950s.

References

Neoclassical architecture in Lazio
Roman Catholic churches completed in 1789
18th-century Roman Catholic church buildings in Italy
Minor basilicas in Lazio
Churches in the metropolitan city of Rome
Neoclassical church buildings in Italy